is a passenger railway station in the city of Shibukawa, Gunma Prefecture, Japan, operated by East Japan Railway Company (JR East).

Lines
Kanashima Station is a station on the Agatsuma Line, and is located 5.5 rail kilometers from the terminus of the line at Shibukawa Station.

Station layout
The station has two opposed side platforms connected by a footbridge. The station is unattended.

Platforms

History
Kanashima Station was opened on 5 August 1959. The station was absorbed into the JR East network upon the privatization of the Japanese National Railways (JNR) on 1 April 1987.

Surrounding area
 Agatsuma River
Kanashima Onsen

External links

 JR East Station information 

Railway stations in Gunma Prefecture
Agatsuma Line
Stations of East Japan Railway Company
Railway stations in Japan opened in 1945
Shibukawa, Gunma